The Cameroon People's Democratic Movement (CPDM; , RDPC) is the ruling  political party in Cameroon. Previously known as the Cameroonian National Union, which had dominated Cameroon politics since independence in the 1960s, it was renamed in 1985. The national president of the CPDM is Paul Biya, the president of Cameroon, while the secretary-general of the party Central Committee is Jean Nkuete.

History

Cameroonian National Union

The UNC sponsored labor, youth, and women's organizations and provided the only list of candidates for the 1973, 1978, and 1983 legislative elections.

Ahmadou Ahidjo became the first head of the UNC in 1966 and continued in that capacity after his resignation as the nation's president in 1982. Following President Paul Biya's assumption of emergency powers in August 1983, Ahidjo, then in France, resigned as party leader. Biya was subsequently elected party chief at a special party congress in September.

CPDM
In 1985, the UNC was renamed the Cameroon People's Democratic Movement (CPDM or Rassemblement Démocratique du Peuple Camerounais—RDPC). Opposition parties were legalized in 1990.

The CPDM won 88 of the 180 seats in the National Assembly of Cameroon in the March 1992 parliamentary election, and through an alliance with the Movement for the Defense of the Republic (MDR), which won six seats, it obtained a parliamentary majority. Biya subsequently won the October 1992 presidential election with about 40% of the vote, ahead of John Fru Ndi of the Social Democratic Front (SDF), who won about 36%. The CPDM gained 116 of the 180 seats in the May 1997 parliamentary election (it initially won 109 seats, but it subsequently won in the three constituencies where the election was held over again in August, gaining seven more seats) and in the October 1997 presidential election, Biya received 92.6% of the vote amidst an opposition boycott.

Political Opposition and Alliances in 2000
The SDF and its allies in the Union for Change remain critical of Biya but are also critical of France, which they call an "accomplice of those in power." However, in 2000 the alliance reportedly was falling apart as the SDF sought to distance itself from the Southern Cameroon National Council (SCNC). The SCNC apparently was accusing the SDF of delaying independence for the northwest and southwest English-speaking provinces by refusing to force its English-speaking members of parliament to resign from the Francophone-dominated National Assembly. Moreover, some members of the opposition wanted their party leaders to join Biya's coalition government so they could share the spoils of office.

By 2000, Biya had shored up his government by forming a coalition with the northern-based UNDP, which had 13 Assembly seats, and with the UPC, which had one seat. Together, the ruling coalition gave Biya a four-fifth's majority in the Assembly. The coalition government enjoyed support from seven of Cameroon's 10 provinces, and thus secured former president Ahidjo's north–south alliance, which he had created in 1958.

From 2002
In the parliamentary election held on 30 June 2002, the party won 149 out of 180 seats, including 16 seats won in a revote on 15 September for constituencies where the election had been invalidated. In the presidential election held on 11 October 2004, Biya won 70.9% of the vote.

The CPDM won 140 out of the 163 initially declared seats in the July 2007 parliamentary election, and it won another 13 seats (out of 17 at stake) in constituencies where the vote was held over again in September, thus winning a total of 153 seats.

Congresses
The party held its first ordinary congress, at which Biya told the party to prepare for competition as the move toward multiparty democracy was beginning,  on June 28, 1990, in Yaoundé. The CPDM's first extraordinary congress was held in Yaoundé on October 7, 1995, and its second ordinary congress was held on December 17–19, 1996. The party held its second extraordinary congress on July 7, 2001 and its third extraordinary congress on July 21, 2006, in Yaoundé. Biya has been consistently re-elected as the CPDM's National President.

Electoral history

Presidential Elections

National Assembly elections

See also 
 Emile Andze Andze
 Ephraim Fombi
 Fon Angwafo III of Mankon
 Françoise Foning

References

Bibliography

External links
 http://www.rdpcpdm.cm/

Political parties established in 1985
Political parties in Cameroon
Parties of one-party systems
Nationalist parties in Africa
1985 establishments in Cameroon